Dudek-e Olya (also Romanized as Dūdek-e ‘Olyā; also known as Dūdek and Dūdek-e Bālā) is a village in Poshtkuh-e Rostam Rural District, Sorna District, Rostam County, Fars Province, Iran. At the 2006 census, its population was 25, in 5 families.

References 

Populated places in Rostam County